Elin Ek, (born 31 August 1973 in By, Sweden), is a Swedish cross-country skier. She participated at the 1998 Olympic Winter Games in Nagano, the 2002 Olympic Winter Games in Salt Lake City and the 2006 Olympic Winter Games in Turin. Elin won the Tjejvasan in 1999 and 2006. and the Vasaloppet main women's event in 2007. She also won the women's Worldloppet in the 2006/2007 season.

She won the Swedish National Championships at the distances of 10 kilometers in 2006, 30 kilometers in 2003 and 2004, and pursuit in 2003 and 2004, skiathlon in 2007 and sprint in 2003. In 2008, she was also part of IFK Mora SK's team, winning the relay event.

Cross-country skiing results
All results are sourced from the International Ski Federation (FIS).

Olympic Games

World Championships

a.  Cancelled due to extremely cold weather.

World Cup

Season standings

Team podiums

2 podiums – (1 , 1 )

References

External links

 Profile at FIS 
 Profil påsports-reference.com 

1973 births
Cross-country skiers at the 1998 Winter Olympics
Cross-country skiers at the 2002 Winter Olympics
Cross-country skiers at the 2006 Winter Olympics
Living people
Olympic cross-country skiers of Sweden
Swedish female cross-country skiers
IFK Mora skiers